Genesis Energy may refer to;
 Genesis Energy Investment, a finance company in Hungary.
 Genesis Energy Limited, formerly Genesis Power Limited, a New Zealand electricity company, which trades under the name Genesis Energy.